The stork is a long-legged wading bird.

Stork or Storks can refer to:

Arts and entertainment 
 stOrk, an experimental metal band
 stOrk (album), the band's 2011 debut album
 Stork, a fictional character in the Storm Hawks series
 Stork (film), a 1971 Australian comedy
 Storks (film), a 2016 animated film

People 
 Stork (surname), a list of people
 Stork (pharaoh), Egyptian pharaoh from the pre-dynastic period who may not have existed
 Song Byung-gu, alias "Stork", Korean professional Starcraft player
 Francis Ford (cricketer) (1866–1940), English cricketer nicknamed "Stork"
 Ted Hendricks (born 1947), American retired National Football League player nicknamed "the Stork"
 Hunter Hendry (1895–1988), Australian cricketer nicknamed "Stork"
 Wolf "the Stork" Popper, founder of the Wolf Popper Synagogue in 1620

Places 
 The Stork, a pub in Lancashire, England

Sports
 Storks (sports club), a baseball and softball team based in The Hague, Netherlands
 Nishinomiya Storks, a Japanese National Basketball League team

Other uses 
 , various Royal Navy ships
 01.002 Fighter Squadron "Storks", a French Air Force fighter squadron
 Stork Ridge, Graham Land, Antarctica
 Stork (margarine), a brand of margarine
 STORK, a platform which allows people to use their Digital national id to establish new e-relations with foreign electronic services
 Scavenger's daughter, a little-used torture device invented during the reign of King Henry VIII of England, also known as the Stork
 Stork B.V., a Dutch company in the aerospace and energy industries
 , operated by the Hudson's Bay Company from 1904–1908, see Hudson's Bay Company vessels

See also
 Special Services Group of Pakistan, also known as the "Black Storks"
 Storch (disambiguation), German for stork
 Storck (disambiguation)

Lists of people by nickname